These are the official results of the Men's Madison Team Race at the 2000 Summer Olympics in Sydney, Australia. There were a total number of 28 participants (fourteen couples) competing in the final, which was held on 21 September 2000.

Medalists

Final classification

References

External links
 Official Report

Cycling at the 2000 Summer Olympics
Cycling at the Summer Olympics – Men's madison
Track cycling at the 2000 Summer Olympics
Men's events at the 2000 Summer Olympics